James Liddy (1934–2008) was an Irish poet, born in Dublin, Ireland. He is best known for his collections In A Blue Smoke (1964) and Blue Mountain (1968). The first volume of Liddy's memoir, The Doctor's House: An Autobiography, was published in 2004.

He died on 4 November 2008.

References

Bibliography
 Irish Poetry of Faith and Doubt:The Cold Heaven, p. 187,  ed. John F. Deane, Wolfhound Press, 1990.

External links
 Irish Writers - James Liddy
 Salmon Poetry
 Arts Council

Irish poets
People from County Clare
1934 births
2008 deaths
20th-century poets